Air Post was a cargo airline based in Auckland, New Zealand. It operated night postal services for New Zealand Post in a joint venture agreement with Airwork, as well as operating ad hoc charter services. Its main base was located at Auckland International Airport.

History 
The airline was established in 1990 and was owned by Airwork (50%) and New Zealand Post (50%).
From 2007 all flights were operated solely by Airwork Ltd on behalf of New Zealand Post.

Fleet
The Air Post fleet consisted of the following aircraft:

Accidents and incidents
 On 27 February 2003 Fokker F27-500 Friendship registration ZK-NAN landed at Woodbourne Airport in Blenheim at the end of a training flight. After the engines were shut down the undercarriage retracted, causing major structural damage to the aircraft's belly. There were no injuries. 
 On 2 May 2005 the crew of Fairchild SA227-AC Metro III ZK-POA lost control of the aircraft during a night cargo flight near the town of Stratford. As a result, the aircraft became overstressed and broke up in mid-air. Both crew members were killed.

See also
 List of defunct airlines of New Zealand
 History of aviation in New Zealand

References

Defunct airlines of New Zealand
Airlines established in 1990
New Zealand companies established in 1990
Airlines disestablished in 2013
2013 disestablishments in New Zealand